The Invasion of Canada may refer to several events in history:

Historical events
The British and French colonial empires contested Canada through several wars:
Quebec Expedition (1711)
King George's War (1744–1748)
French and Indian War (1724–1763)
The United States invaded Canada in two wars:
 Invasion of Canada (1775), American Revolutionary War
Invasion of Canada (1812), War of 1812
American rebels from the Hunters' Lodges invaded Canada in the Patriot War (1837–1838) and the Battle of the Windmill in 1838
Fenian raids (1866 and 1871)
War Plan Red (mid-1920s), a U.S. invasion plan created as a contingency for the unlikely event of war with the United Kingdom

Arts and literature
The Invasion of Canada, a 1980 book by Pierre Berton about the War of 1812
 Canadian Bacon, a 1995 comedy film which satirizes relations along the Canada–United States border